The nematoceran infraorder Psychodomorpha (sometimes misspelled Psychomorpha - which is also the name of a genus of noctuid moths) includes three families, Psychodidae, Blephariceridae, and Tanyderidae, as well as the superfamily Scatopsoidea, which contains the families Canthyloscelidae, Scatopsidae and Valeseguyidae.

External links
 Tree of Life Psychodomorpha

 
Insect infraorders